Hossein Ghafourizadeh (16 June 1943 – 15 May 2022) was an Iranian sprinter. He competed in the men's 400 metres at the 1964 Summer Olympics.

References

External links
 

1943 births
2022 deaths
Athletes (track and field) at the 1964 Summer Olympics
Iranian male sprinters
Olympic athletes of Iran
20th-century Iranian people